A referendum on the formation of the Federation of Rhodesia and Nyasaland was held in Southern Rhodesia on 9 April 1953. The proposal was approved by 63.45% of voters.

Results

References

1953 referendums
1953 federation referendum
Federation referendum
1953 elections in Africa
Referendums in Zimbabwe
April 1953 events in Africa